CSS Rob Roy was a Confederate blockade runner commanded by Captain William Watson, that ran to and from Bermuda, the Bahamas and Cuba from 1862 to 1864, during the American Civil War. 

Watson, who had immigrated from Great Britain several years before, had originally enlisted in the Confederate Army as a sergeant before being wounded at the Second Battle of Corinth, and discharged due to his injuries. Hiring out a schooner, commissioned as Rob Roy, Williams would bring desperately needed supplies into blockaded southern ports, specifically Galveston, Texas before selling the ship after financial disagreements with business associates. Williams would later write about his wartime naval career in an autobiography The Civil War Adventures of a Blockade Runner in 1892.

References

Further reading 

Rob Roy
Maritime incidents in March 1865